Ecuador competed at the 2019 World Aquatics Championships in Gwangju, South Korea from 12 to 28 July.

Open water swimming

Ecuador qualified three male and three female open water swimmers.

Men

Women

Mixed

Swimming

Ecuador entered two swimmers.

Men

Women

References

World Aquatics Championships
2019
Nations at the 2019 World Aquatics Championships